The spider genus Spintharus occurs from the northeastern United States to Brazil. Nicholas Marcellus Hentz circumscribed the genus in 1850, initially as a monospecific genus containing his newly described species S. flavidus.

It is very similar to the genus Thwaitesia, and both are similar to Episinus. Unlike Argyrodes, they have two setae in place of a colulus.

Specimens of S. flavidus are variable in structure. Only some have an elevated eye region or humps on the anterior of the abdomen.

Females of S. gracilis are 3.7mm long, males 2.3mm.

Some of the new specific names were named in honor of political figures, artists, and celebrities. As of 2017, when the electronic pre-print was published, Spintharus was the spider genus with the most species named after celebrities.

An earlier revision of the genus was by Herbert Walter Levi; his taxonomy recognized two species: S. flavidus and S. gracilis.

Species

, the World Spider Catalog (WSC), largely following Agnarsson and colleagues, accepts the following extant species:
 Spintharus barackobamai  – Cuba
 Spintharus berniesandersi  – Cuba
 Spintharus davidattenboroughi  – Jamaica
 Spintharus davidbowiei  – Mexico
 Spintharus dayleae  – Saint Lucia, Grenada
 Spintharus flavidus  (type species) – USA, Central and South America
 Spintharus frosti  – Dominican Republic
 Spintharus giraldoalayoni  – Cuba
 Spintharus goodbreadae  – Cuba
 Spintharus gracilis  – Brazil
 Spintharus greerae  – Mexico
 Spintharus jesselaueri  – Dominica
 Spintharus leonardodicaprioi  – Dominican Republic
Spintharus leverger  – Brazil
 Spintharus manrayi  – Cuba
 Spintharus michelleobamaae  – Cuba
 Spintharus rallorum  – Puerto Rico, Saint Kitts and Nevis
 Spintharus skelly  – Dominican Republic

The WSC also recognizes one fossil species in the genus:
  Spintharus longisoma  — Dominican amber

Formerly accepted species in Spintharus include:
 Spintharus minutus  (= Theridion antillanum )
 Spintharus hentzi  (= Spintharus flavidus )
 Spintharus argenteus  (nomen dubium)

References

External links

Theridiidae
Araneomorphae genera
Spiders of North America
Spiders of South America
Taxa named by Nicholas Marcellus Hentz